In North Korea, the Political Bureau of the Central Committee of the Workers' Party of Korea (WPK), or simply the Politburo, formerly the Political Committee (1946–61), is the highest decision-making body in the ruling party between sessions of its Central Committee. Article 25 of the Party Charter stipulates that "The Political Bureau of the Party Central Committee and its Standing Committee organize and direct all party work on behalf of the party Central Committee between plenary meetings. The Political Bureau of the Party Central Committee shall meet at least once every month." The Politburo is elected by the Central Committee of the Workers' Party of Korea.

History
Until April 1956, the Politburo was known as the Political Council. After Kim Il-sung's unitary ruling system was established in the 1960s, the Politburo was transformed from a decision-making body where policies could be discussed into a rubber stamp body. Leading members have disappeared without explanation; the last was Kim Tong-gyu, in 1977. Politburo members under Kim Il-sung and Kim Jong-il lacked a strong power base, and depended on the party leader for their position. Because of this, the Politburo became a loyal servant of the party leader.

The Politburo Standing Committee (PSC) of the Workers' Party of Korea was established at the 6th Congress in 1980, and became the highest WPK body when the Politburo and the Central Committee were not in session. With the death of O Jin-u in 1995, Kim Jong-il remained the only member of the Politburo Standing Committee still alive; the four others (Kim Il-sung, Kim Il, O Jin-u, and Ri Jong-ok) died in office. Between O Jin-u's death and the 3rd Conference, there were no reports indicating that Kim Jong-il or the central party leadership was planning to renew the PSC composition.

Similar to the Central Committee, the Politburo was dormant during much of Kim Jong-il's rule; however, the 3rd Conference elected new Politburo members. While many foreign observers believed it would signify a generational shift, it did not; the youngest member was 53 years old, and the average age was 74 (with 12 over age 80). The majority of new members were aides to Kim Jong-il or Kim family members. Kim Kyong-hui (Kim Jong-il's sister) and Jang Song-thaek (Kim Kyong-hui's husband) were appointed full and candidate member, respectively. Several of Jang's protégés were elected candidate members, including Ju Sang-song (Minister of People's Security), U Tong-chuk (First Deputy Director of the State Security Department) and Choe Ryong-hae (Secretary for Military Affairs). Pak Jong-su (First Deputy Head of the Organization and Guidance Department), a leading facilitator of Kim Jong-un's succession, was appointed a candidate member. Most of the new members were cabinet members, military officials, party secretaries or officials from the security establishment. Ten members from the National Defense Commission and three deputy premiers were appointed to the Politbüro. Leading economic experts (such as Hong Sok-yong and Tae Jong-su) and foreign experts (such as Kang Sok-ju, Kim Yong-il and Kim Yang-gon) became members. At the 4th Conference, one-third of the Politburo was dismissed in unannounced retirements and dismissals. Jang Song-thaek, Pak To-chun and Vice Marshal Kim Jong-gak were promoted from candidate to full membership; Hyon Chol-hae, Kim Won-hong and Ri Myong-su, all members of the Central Military Commission, were appointed to full Politburo membership. Kwak Pom-gi, O Kuk-ryol, Ro Tu-chol, Ri Pyong-sam and Jo Yon-jun were elected candidate members.

Role
Officially, the Politburo is responsible for conducting its activities as well as deciding on important issues between two Central Committee plenums and should meet once a month. Its members include important state and military leaders, as the Premier and the vice-chairmen of the State Affairs Commission.

The Politburo's inner body is the Presidium (formerly the Standing Committee), elected by the WPK Central Committee, in charge of day-to-day party work. It is usually made up of the supreme leader and four other members. In practice, the Presidium is the highest body in both the party and the country, and its decisions de facto have the force of law.

Current membership

As of 8 September 2022, the Politburo is composed of 15 members and 14 alternate members, with the following line-up.

Members

Alternate members

See also

Politburo of the Communist Party of the Soviet Union
Politburo of the Chinese Communist Party

References

Bibliography
Articles, books and journal entries

 

Books

 
 
 
 
 
 

Politburo of the Workers' Party of Korea